The Sisak killings refers to the illegal detainment, torture and murder of at least 24 Croatian Serb civilians from the city of Sisak by members of the Croatian Army and police from July 1991 to June 1992 during the Croatian War of Independence.

Background

In March 1991, Croatia began to descend into war. The Republic of Serb Krajina (RSK) declared its intention to secede from Croatia and join the Republic of Serbia while the Government of the Republic of Croatia declared it a rebellion. In June 1991 Croatia declared independence from Yugoslavia. Tensions eventually broke out into full-scale war, which lasted until 1995. 

According to the 1991 Croatian census, the city of Sisak had a population of 84,348 of which 54,621 were Croats and 19,209 were Serbs. Serbs accounted for approximately 24% of the population. Sisak is situated in central Croatia, approximately 50 kilometres southeast of Zagreb.

Crimes and killings
Between 1991 and 1992, Croatian Serbs living in Sisak and surrounding areas were subjected to threats, abductions, killings and "disappearances". According to Amnesty International, as many as 21 Serb villagers were thought to have been killed on 22 August 1991 in several villages when "Croatian security forces undertook a house-to-house search
for Serbian paramilitaries who had fired mortars at the town of Sisak". Another 12 were reported to have been killed in March 1992 some of whom were workers at the city's oil refinery.

Trial
Vladimir Milanković, wartime deputy police commander of the Sisak area, and Drago Bosnjak, a former member of the Sisak special police unit "Wolves" went on trial in 2012 for war crimes. In 2013, Milanković was convicted of ordering illegal arrests and not punishing crimes against Serb civilians such as illegal detentions, threats, and mental and physical abuses which resulted in the deaths of 24 people between mid-July 1991 and mid-June 1992. Bosnjak was acquitted.

In 2004, Amnesty International noted that "some of those who may have directly committed, ordered or tolerated [crimes in Sisak], or may have participated in their subsequent cover-up, remain in powerful positions at the local level of state institutions or in the police and are thus still in a position to undermine the investigation of these crimes."

Croatian human rights activists claim that over one hundred Croatian Serb civilians were killed in Sisak during the war.

References

1991 in Croatia
Mass murder in 1991
Mass murder in 1992
Croatian war crimes in the Croatian War of Independence
Massacres in Croatia
Massacres of Serbs
History of the Serbs of Croatia
Massacres in the Croatian War of Independence